Wali Sultan Lundy (born September 8, 1983) is a rapper and former American football running back who played for the National Football League. Lundy was drafted in round six, pick 1 of the 2006 NFL Draft after playing college football at the University of Virginia.  He is a founding member of Fresh Fuzion.

Early years 
Wali started his career at Holy Cross High School in Delran Township, New Jersey, where he broke the records for rushing and most touchdowns. He had previously attended Florence Township Memorial High School in Florence Township, New Jersey, where he played for the Flashes.

College career 
He holds many Virginia Cavaliers records and Atlantic Coast Conference records, including being the all-time touchdown leader in ACC history with 52 touchdowns. He played in 49 games at Virginia, where he rushed for 3,193 yards, the fifth-highest total ever in school history, and 4,497 all-purpose yards.

NFL career 
It was announced on August 29, 2006, that Texans running back Domanick Davis would be unable to start the team's first regular season game due to a lingering knee injury.  Houston Head Coach Gary Kubiak stated that Lundy would start the first game of his rookie campaign in Davis's place. Lundy stepped up for 476 yards and 4 touchdowns in his rookie season. On August 31, 2007 the Texans released him.

Music career 
In a 2004 interview with Sports Illustrated, Lundy suggested he would aspire to be a rap artist if football didn't work out. In 2010, he partnered with producer Jase Harley and established a collective called Fresh Fuzion.

References

1983 births
Living people
Holy Cross Academy (New Jersey) alumni
People from Florence Township, New Jersey
Sportspeople from New Brunswick, New Jersey
African-American players of American football
American football running backs
Virginia Cavaliers football players
Houston Texans players
Players of American football from New Jersey
People from Willingboro Township, New Jersey
21st-century African-American sportspeople
20th-century African-American people